Ysgol Glanaethwy is a drama school in Bangor, Gwynedd, Wales. It is known in particular for its choir, Côr Glanaethwy.

History
Ysgol Glanaethwy was opened in 1990, founded by Cefin and Rhian Roberts. It is a performing arts school that operates outside normal school hours. Younger children take acting lessons and choir practice and the older pupils have choir practice only.

The school became well known when its choir for older pupils took part in the UK TV channel BBC 1's Last Choir Standing show in 2008. The students went through auditions, callbacks, and knock out rounds. After being in the sing off once and chosen to continue by the judges, the choir won second prize in the phone-in vote for the final.

Choirs
The school has three choirs: the junior choir, the senior choir and the 'Da Capo'.

In 2015 Côr Glanaethwy also reached the live finals of Britain's Got Talent, finishing in third place.

In February 2018 the BBC controversially chose Côr Glanaethwy, instead of Bangor Cathedral's own choir, to sing during the St Davids Day edition of the Songs of Praise programme filmed at the cathedral.

Awards

Glanaethwy have performed at the Royal Albert Hall's Schools Proms, and have won many competition prizes, including:

1st and 2nd in the National Eisteddfod of Wales 
Urdd Eisteddfod 
Music For Youth 
Finalists in Choir of the Year
Second in Côr Cymru 
Second in Eisteddfod Llangollen (2010)
First in Llangollen

References

External links

Welsh Eisteddfod winners
Schools in Gwynedd
Bangor, Gwynedd
Britain's Got Talent contestants